Carlos Ruiz may refer to:

Authors and journalists 
 Carlos Ruiz Chapellín (1865–1912), Venezuelan showman
 Carlos Ruiz Apezteguia (1930–1995), Paraguayan journalist and entrepreneur
 Carlos Ruiz-Tagle (1932–1991), Chilean writer
 Carlos Ruiz Zafón (1964–2020), Spanish novelist

Sports 
 Carlos Ruiz (sailor) (born 1940), Salvadoran Olympic sailor
 Carlos Ruíz (volleyball) (born 1957), Cuban volleyball player
 Carlos Ruiz (Argentine footballer) (born 1971), Argentine footballer
 Carlos Ruiz (Guatemalan footballer) (born 1979), Guatemalan footballer
 Carlos Ruiz (baseball) (born 1979), Panamanian baseball player
 Carlos Ruiz (footballer, born 1983), Spanish footballer
 Carlos Ruiz (Peruvian footballer) (born 2002), Peruvian footballer

See also
 Carlos Ruiz peleando con un cochero (1897), Venezuelan film
 Carl Ruiz (1975–2019), judge on the American elimination cooking game show Guy's Grocery Games